The Ministry of Defence Police Act 1987 is an Act of the Parliament of the United Kingdom which came into full force on 5 May 1987.

Purpose 
The Act continued the existence of the Ministry of Defence Police which had been created under previous laws (in particular the Special Constables Act 1923).

Extent 
The Act applies throughout the United Kingdom with variations included to match the requirements of the three jurisdictions of England and Wales, Scotland and Northern Ireland.

See also 
Ministry of Defence Police

References 

United Kingdom Acts of Parliament 1987
Ministry of Defence Police